Confederación General del Trabajo (independiente) (Spanish for 'General Confederation of Labour (independent)') is a national trade union centre in Nicaragua. CGTi was founded in 1963, as the trade union wing of the Nicaraguan Socialist Party. CGTi was a member of the World Federation of Trade Unions.

CGTi joined UDEL. When the National Reconstruction Government was formed on July 19, 1979, CGTi had one of 33 representatives in the Council of State.

As of 1983, CGTi had 17177 members belonging to 19 affiliated unions. It was  mainly active in construction, manufacturing, transport, communications, agriculture, fishing, electricity and gas sectors. As of 2006, CGTi was a part of the anti-Sandinista Permanent Workers' Congress.

References

Trade unions in Nicaragua
Nicatagua

Trade unions established in 1963